Elena Sergeyevna Sokolova (born 15 February 1980) is a Russian former competitive figure skater. She is the 2003 World silver medalist, a three-time European medalist (2003–2004, 2006), and a three-time Russian national champion (2003–2004, 2006).

Personal life 
Elena Sokolova was born on 15 February 1980 in Moscow. She studied at the Institute for Physical Culture in Moscow.

Career 

Sokolova began skating at age four — following bronchitis and generally poor health, doctors told her parents that she should take up a physical activity.

Early in her career, Sokolova was coached by V. Tumanov. In 1997, she switched to Marina Kudriavtseva and Viktor Kudriavtsev and was coached by them in Moscow until 2000 when she moved to Alexei Mishin in Saint Petersburg. Sokolova sustained a concussion in the summer of 2002. She returned to Kudriavtsev in autumn 2002. 

Sokolova won the silver medal at the 2003 World Championships and three European medals. She finished 14th at the 2006 Winter Olympics. At the 2006 World Championships, Sokolova finished 4th with a personal best total score of 177.85 points. She retired from competition after finishing 13th at the 2007 Worlds.

Sokolova skated with the Champions on Ice tour every spring from 2003 to 2006.

Programs

Results
GP = Champions Series / Grand Prix

References

External links

 
 Elena Sokolova video archive

1980 births
Living people
Russian female single skaters
Olympic figure skaters of Russia
Figure skaters at the 1998 Winter Olympics
Figure skaters at the 2006 Winter Olympics
Figure skaters from Moscow
World Figure Skating Championships medalists
European Figure Skating Championships medalists
World Junior Figure Skating Championships medalists
Universiade medalists in figure skating
Universiade gold medalists for Russia
Competitors at the 1999 Winter Universiade